Kyle Prior (born 30 August 1999) is a Scottish footballer who plays as a midfielder.

Career
After graduating from the club's Under 17s side, Glasgow-born Prior signed amateur terms with Dumbarton before moving on loan to Junior side Vale of Clyde. After enjoying a successful spell with the club he was recalled in February 2017, and promoted to the first team later that month. He made his debut as an 82nd minute sub in place of Christian Nade in a 4–0 victory over Raith Rovers.

Prior agreed his first professional deal with the club in May 2017, signing until the summer of 2018. In January 2018 Prior joined Lowland Football League side BSC Glasgow on loan until the end of the season. Prior left Dumbarton at the end of his contract.

References

External links

1999 births
Living people
Scottish footballers
Association football midfielders
Dumbarton F.C. players
Scottish Professional Football League players
Broomhill F.C. (Scotland) players
Vale of Clyde F.C. players
Lowland Football League players
Scottish Junior Football Association players